Véronique Dehant is a Belgian geodesist and geophysicist. She specializes in 
modeling the deformation of the Earth's interior in response to forcing from the 
Sun, Moon, and the Earth's rotation. 
She has used similar techniques to study Mercury, Venus, Mars and icy 
satellites of the outer planets. 
She primarily works at the Royal Observatory of Belgium, but also serves as an 
Extraordinary Professor at the Université Catholique de Louvain.

Early life and education 
Dehant was born in Brussels, Belgium, in 1959. She received all her degrees, in mathematics and physics, from the Université Catholique de Louvain, receiving a bachelor's degree in 1981, followed by a master's degree in 1982 and a doctorate in 1986.

Research and career
Initially Dehant's research focused on better understanding the rotation of the Earth in space (precession 
and nutation). She developed models that take into account the structure and interfaces of the Earth, including effects of Earth tides and core resonances.
This work led to a new and more accurate reference model for the Earth's rotation. 
Her research group was rewarded for this work with the 300,000 Euro Descartes Prize 
in 2003.   
  
Dehant is a co-investigator on the NASA RISE (Rotation and Interior Structure Experiment) and SEIS (Seismic Experiment for Interior Structure) projects, which are being hosted by the InSight mission to Mars. The RISE team will use Doppler measurements to determine the rotation and position of Mars in space. This in turn provides information about the structure of the deep interior of Mars.

Dehant's work has been widely recognized. In 2003 she received the European Geosciences Union geodesy prize, known as the Vening-Meinesz Medal. She is a Fellow of the American Geophysical Union and a foreign member of the French Academy of Sciences. In 2016 she received the Whitten medal from the American Geophysical Union. This award is given for "outstanding achievement in research on the form and dynamics of the Earth and planets".

Awards and honors
 1988: Charles Lagrange Prize
 2003: Vening-Meinesz Medal, European Geosciences Union
 2003: Descartes Prize of the European Union
 2007: Fellow of the American Geophysical Union
 2014: Honorary Doctorate, Observatory of Paris 
 2015: Foreign Member, French Academy of Sciences 
 2016: Charles A. Whitten Medal

Books 
 V. Dehant and P.M. Mathews, Precession, Nutation, and Wobble of the Earth, Cambridge University Press, 536 pages, April 2015, .

See also
List of women in leadership positions on astronomical instrumentation projects

References

Members of the French Academy of Sciences
Fellows of the American Geophysical Union
Women geophysicists
Belgian women scientists
1959 births
Scientists from Brussels
Living people
20th-century Belgian scientists
21st-century Belgian scientists
Academic staff of the Université catholique de Louvain
Université catholique de Louvain alumni
Geodesists
Planetary scientists
Women planetary scientists